Iván Balliu Campeny (born 1 January 1992) is a professional footballer who plays as a right-back for Rayo Vallecano and the Albania national team.
 
After starting out at Barcelona B, he went on to compete professionally in Spain, Portugal and France.

Balliu represented his native Spain at youth level before declaring for Albania, for which he qualified via his father. He was first included in an Albanian senior squad in 2017, making his debut in October of that year.

Club career

Barcelona
Born in Caldes de Malavella, Girona, Catalonia to an Albanian father and a Spanish mother, Balliu joined FC Barcelona's youth system in 2004, aged 12. He made his senior debut in the 2010–11 season, playing two Segunda División games with the reserves and starting against Girona FC for a 2–0 away win. In that year, he was also captain of the treble-winning Juvenil A team.

Arouca
On 30 May 2013, Balliu's contract expired and he was told by Barcelona that he would be released. One month later, he signed with F.C. Arouca in Portugal for two seasons, making his Primeira Liga debut on 1 September in a 1–0 home victory over Rio Ave FC (90 minutes played).

Metz
Balliu joined French club FC Metz on 17 July 2015, on a two-year deal. He scored his first goal as a professional on 16 October, helping the hosts come from behind in the 2–2 home draw with Clermont Foot.

After contributing 24 appearances in his first season to help his team return to Ligue 1 after a one-year absence, Balliu's first match in the competition occurred on 13 August 2016, in a 3–2 home win over Lille OSC.

Almería
On 12 August 2019, Balliu agreed to a two-year contract with UD Almería of the Spanish second division. He scored his first goal in his country of birth on 7 March 2020, helping the hosts defeat Deportivo de La Coruña 4–0.

Rayo Vallecano
Balliu moved to newly-promoted Rayo Vallecano on 14 July 2021, on a two-year deal. He made his La Liga debut on 15 August at the age of 29, playing the entire 3–0 defeat at Sevilla FC. His first goal came the following 9 January, when he closed the 1–1 home draw against Real Betis.

International career
Of Albanian descent on his father's side, Balliu was eligible to represent Albania, speaking of his interest in an interview on 24 October 2016. On 22 August 2017 he received Albanian citizenship, thus becoming eligible to play for the national team. He was handed his first call shortly after when newly appointed coach Christian Panucci selected him for the 2018 FIFA World Cup qualifiers against Liechtenstein and Macedonia on 2 and 5 September, and earned his first cap also during that stage, playing the first half of the 3–0 loss against Spain in Alicante on 6 October.

Personal life
On 17 June 2017, Balliu married Marta Soler.

Career statistics

Club

International

References

External links

Albania national team data 

1992 births
Living people
People from Selva
Spanish people of Albanian descent
Sportspeople from the Province of Girona
Spanish footballers
Albanian footballers
Footballers from Catalonia
Association football defenders
La Liga players
Segunda División players
FC Barcelona Atlètic players
UD Almería players
Rayo Vallecano players
Primeira Liga players
F.C. Arouca players
Ligue 1 players
Ligue 2 players
FC Metz players
Spain youth international footballers
Albania international footballers
Spanish expatriate footballers
Albanian expatriate footballers
Expatriate footballers in Portugal
Expatriate footballers in France
Spanish expatriate sportspeople in Portugal
Albanian expatriate sportspeople in Portugal
Spanish expatriate sportspeople in France
Albanian expatriate sportspeople in France